"Sorry" is a song by New Zealand recording artist, Bic Runga. The single was released in Australia and Germany only as the final single from her debut studio album, Drive (1997).

Track listing
 Australian CD single (Columbia – 666639.2)
 "Sorry"	- 3:23
 "Dust" - 2:09
 "Close the Door Put Out the Light" - 2:37

References

External links
Bic's official website

1999 singles
Bic Runga songs
1997 songs
Columbia Records singles